In molecular biology, FMR1 antisense RNA 1 (FMR1-AS1), also known as ASFMR1 or FMR4, is a long non-coding RNA. The FMR1-AS1 gene overlaps, and is antisense to, the CGG repeat region of the FMR1 gene. Its expression is upregulated in fragile X syndrome premutation carriers, and silenced in patients with fragile X syndrome. FMR1-AS1 has an anti-apoptotic function.

See also
 Long noncoding RNA

References

Non-coding RNA